Mpingwe is a town located in Southern Malawi, situated between Mpingwe Hill and Bangwe Hill.

The town has inspired the London Based Last Man Stands team Mpingwe MAUK.

References

Populated places in Malawi